The 2000 Westel 900 Budapest Open was a women's tennis tournament played on outdoor clay courts in Budapest in Hungary that was part of the Tier IVb category of the 2000 WTA Tour. It was the fifth edition of the tournament and was held from 17 April until 23 April 2000. Unseeded Tathiana Garbin won the singles title and earned $16,000 first-prize money.

Finals

Singles
 Tathiana Garbin defeated  Kristie Boogert, 6–2, 7–6(7–4)
 It was Garbin's only singles title of her career.

Doubles
 Lubomira Bacheva /  Cristina Torrens Valero defeated  Jelena Kostanić /  Sandra Načuk, 6–0, 6–2

References

External links
 ITF tournament edition details
 Tournament draws

Westel 900 Budapest Open
Budapest Grand Prix
Buda
Buda